Blatna Brezovica is a village east of Vrhnika in the Inner Carniola region of Slovenia.

Name
Blatna Brezovica was attested in written sources as Bresawitz and Wresawitz in 1496. Archaeological investigations were led here by Tatjana Bregant.

Church

The local church south of the settlement is dedicated to Saint James and belongs to the Parish of Vrhnika.

References

External links
Blatna Brezovica on Geopedia

Populated places in the Municipality of Vrhnika